Fang Zhimin (Wade–Giles: Fang Chih Min; August 21, 1899 – August 6, 1935) was a Chinese communist military and political leader.

Life
Born in a poor peasant household in Yixian, Jiangxi Province, Fang joined the Chinese Communist Party in 1924 and assisted in setting up a provincial party organization.

After the failure of the Shanghai Uprising in 1927, Fang returned to Jiangxi, where he worked in organizing the peasantry and urged them to take part in armed uprisings.

From 1928 to 1933 Fang conducted guerrilla operations, enacted land reforms, established a base area in the border area of Jiangxi and Fujian provinces, and organized a section of the Chinese Red Army.

Death
Fang was later elected a member of the Central Committee during the sixth session of the Fifth Party Congress. Fang was captured by the Kuomintang in January 1935 and executed on August 6, 1935. The 2015 opera Fang Zhimin commemorates his life and death.

 

1899 births
1935 deaths
Chinese Communist Party politicians from Jiangxi
Chinese Red Army generals
Delegates to the 5th National Congress of the Chinese Communist Party
Executed people from Jiangxi
Executed Republic of China people
Generals from Jiangxi
People executed by the Republic of China by firing squad
Politicians from Shangrao
Republic of China politicians from Jiangxi